Feni Computer Institute (Bengali: ফেনী কম্পিউটার ইনস্টিটিউট, also known as FCI)  is the first and only ICT based polytechnic institute for Diploma in Engineering courses in Bangladesh. It is situated in Feni Sadar Upazila of Feni City. Founded in 2003, It is directed under Directorate of Technical Education. Every year, around 300 students get accepted to their Diploma in Engineering programs to study about Information Technology. FCI is a member of Asia-Pac ific Economic Cooperation (APEC).

History 
The foundation of Feni Computer Institute was laid by former Prime Minister Begum Khaleda Zia on October 6, 2003 to convert the vast population into skilled and employable human resources in information and communication technology (ICT). It has an average enrollment of 200 students annually. Its Created in 2003 and Study Curriculum Activities Started from 2005 under Bangladesh Technical Education Board (BTEB).

It is specialized Institute for 4 years Diploma-in-Engineering Program. Every Year students from all over Bangladesh explode into FCI for admission because of its reputation made by only in a year. The just established FCI got Accreditation Certificate from  Asia Pacific Accreditation and Certification Commission.

Mision & Vision 
 To Provide quality education and training. 
 To create skilled Mid Level Professional Engineer. 
 To reduce the digital divide between urban and rural people through ICT education and training. 
 To extend support to the industry in the field of ICT. 
 To provide employable skilled manpower for the country as well as abroad in the field of ICT. 
 To act a leading institute in the field of ICT.

Faculties 
FCI provides three technology. they are :
 Computer Science and Technology (CST)
 Telecommunication Technology (TCT).

Short Courses 

Feni Computer Institute has some Others Short Course for Unemployed people. Those Courses age convert the vast population into skilled and employable human resources in ICT of Bangladesh. Those Courses are:

 Web Design
 Graphic Design
 IT Support

Campus Tour 
There are seven multi-storied buildings on the FCI campus. They are:

 Academic Building
 Class Room Lab Room
 Seminar Hall
 Library
 Medical Center
 Satata Store  
 Administrative Building
 Principal Office
 Academic In-charge Office
 Vice Principal Office
 Information Center
 Dept: Head Room (CST, DTNT, TCT)
 Teachers Room
 VIP Guest Room
 Children Care Center
 STEP
 SEIP
 Canteen
 FCI Mosque
 Bongobondhu Boys Hostel
 Fazilatunnesa Girls Hostel
Principal Bungalow

Student organizations 
FCI has some student organizations for co-curriculum activities. They are:
 FCI Rover Scout (Boys)
FCI Rover Scout (Girls)
FCI ICT Club
FCI Blood Donation Group
FCI Ex-Student Association

Clubs
FCI has 4 active clubs.

 FCI ICT Club
 FCI Cultural Club
 FCI Blood Donation Group
 Feni Computer Institute Rover Scout Group

List of Principals 

2003 establishments in Bangladesh
Education in Bangladesh
Educational institutions established in 2003
Polytechnic institutes in Bangladesh